Third from the Right is a 1950 West German musical crime film directed by Géza von Cziffra and starring Vera Molnar, Robert Lindner and Peter van Eyck. It was made by the Hamburg-based company Real Film at the Wandsbek Studios. The film's sets were designed by the art director Herbert Kirchhoff.

Cast
Vera Molnar as Katrin
Robert Lindner as Viktor
Peter van Eyck as Renato
Marianne Wischmann as Asta
Grethe Weiser as Lotte Brühl
Paul Kemp as Hähnchen
Oskar Sima as Schneider
Rudolf Platte as Braun
Arno Paulsen as Herwitz
Willi Rose as detective commissioner Metz
Hans Zesch-Ballot as Kriminalrat Bittner
Carl Voscherau as Inspizient Müller
Josef Dahmen as Josef, waiter
Willy Witte as Chauffeur
Kurt Meister as Kriminalbeamter
Benno Gellenbeck as Managing director of the Kakadu Bar
Eva Pflug as Hilde
Edelweiß Malchin as Gerda
Katharina Brauren as Frau Goll
Edmond Ardisson
Erwin Bredow
Iska Geri
Gerhard Gregor
Alfred Hause
Evelyn Künneke
Maria Litto
Bruce Low
Laszlo Nyaky
Gabor Orban
Laya Raki as exotic dancer
Kurt Reimann
Gertrud Söderling-Hiller
Horst von Otto
Gerhard Wendland

References

External links

1950 musical films
1950 crime films
German musical films
German crime films
West German films
Films directed by Géza von Cziffra
German black-and-white films
1950s German films
1950s German-language films
Films shot at Wandsbek Studios